Shilin may refer to:

China
Shilin Yi Autonomous County (石林彝族自治县), of Kunming, Yunnan
Stone Forest (石林), limestone formations in Shilin County, Yunnan
Shilinxia, scenic area in Pinggu District, Beijing

Taiwan
Shilin District (士林區), Taipei
 Shilin Night Market in Shilin District

Other
Shilin (given name)
Shilin (surname)